Shockwave (Originally The 7up Shockwave) is an Intamin stand-up roller coaster, located at Drayton Manor Resort in Tamworth in the United Kingdom. It was opened in 1994 and is one of the only two stand-up coasters in Europe. It is also the only stand-up roller coaster with a zero-gravity roll ever made.

The ride, designed by Werner Stengel, was created as part of a two-year, £4M project in 1993-94. Shockwave's station is located directly above The turntable station of the Adventure Cove River Rapids ride, located in the Adventure Cove area.

Shockwave was supplied and sold under the brand of Intamin amusement rides, despite the technical design and manufacturing being subcontracted to Giovanola.  It uses a box section track, despite not being made by B&M.

Ride Experience
Originally, the track was a shade of grey with brown supports, but between 2004 and 2012 it was repainted to have a light blue track and turquoise supports. Also in 2012 the Trains were repainted: 1 Blue and the other Red, the red train was previously used when the blue trains in for maintenance, however it is no longer on the track (or in the maintenance bay) at all. Originally, the train would re enter the station by braking to a low speed and moving back to the loading area; now it stops completely before moving back to the loading area. In 2016, the ride and trains received new logos

In 1994, the ride opened along with two other roller coasters in the UK: The Big One at Blackpool Pleasure Beach and Nemesis at Alton Towers (which opened one week before the Shockwave).

References 

Stand-up roller coasters
Roller coasters in the United Kingdom
Roller coasters introduced in 1994